Madrasa Ibn Tafargine is one of the madrasahs of the Medina of Tunis.

Location 

The madrasa was located in Haouanet Achour Street, in El Hafsia district.

History
It was built during the Hafsid era.

Etymology

The madrasa got its name from its founder, Ibn Tafargine who is buried in it.

Description

It had the basic elements of a madrasa (skifa, ghorfa, sahn, etc.) and a large hall.
	
Its skifa had a straight shape and a higher level comparing to the street and the hall.

References 

Madrasas in the medina of Tunis